Kuhdasht Rural District was a rural district (dehestan) in the Central District of Miandorud County, Mazandaran Province, Iran. At the 2006 census, its population was 20,601, in 5,213 families.  Kuhdasht Rural District was split into Kuhdasht-e Gharbi Rural District and Kuhdasht-e Sharqi Rural District

References 

Former Rural Districts of Mazandaran Province
Miandorud County